The following is a list of tautonyms: zoological names of species consisting of two identical words (the generic name and the specific name have the same spelling). Such names are allowed in zoology, but not in botany, where the two parts of the name of a species must differ (though differences as small as one letter are permitted, as in cumin, Cuminum cyminum).

Mammals

Alces alces (Linnaeus, 1758) — Eurasian elk, moose
Axis axis (Erxleben, 1777) — chital, axis deer
Bison bison (Linnaeus, 1758) — American bison, buffalo
Capreolus capreolus (Linnaeus, 1758) — European roe deer, roe deer
Caracal caracal (Schreber, 1776) — caracal
Chinchilla chinchilla (Lichtenstein, 1829) — short-tailed chinchilla
Chiropotes chiropotes (Humboldt, 1811) — red-backed bearded saki
Cricetus cricetus (Linnaeus, 1758) — common hamster, European hamster
Crocuta crocuta (Erxleben, 1777) — spotted hyena
Dama dama (Linnaeus, 1758) — European fallow deer
Feroculus feroculus (Kelaart, 1850) — Kelaart's long-clawed shrew
Gazella gazella (Pallas, 1766) — mountain gazelle
Genetta genetta (Linnaeus, 1758) — common genet
Gerbillus gerbillus (Olivier, 1801) — lesser Egyptian gerbil
Giraffa giraffa (von Schreber, 1784) — southern giraffe
Glis glis (Linnaeus, 1766) — European edible dormouse, European fat dormouse
Gorilla gorilla (Savage, 1847) — western gorilla
Gulo gulo (Linnaeus, 1758) — wolverine
Hoolock hoolock (Harlan, 1834) — western hoolock gibbon
Hyaena hyaena (Linnaeus, 1758) — striped hyena
Indri indri (Gmelin, 1788) — indri
Jaculus jaculus (Linnaeus, 1758) — lesser Egyptian jerboa
Lagurus lagurus (Pallas, 1773) — steppe vole, steppe lemming
Lemmus lemmus (Linnaeus, 1758) — Norway lemming
Lutra lutra (Linnaeus, 1758) — European otter
Lynx lynx (Linnaeus, 1758) — Eurasian lynx
Macrophyllum macrophyllum (Schinz, 1821) — long-legged bat
Marmota marmota (Linnaeus, 1758) — Alpine marmot
Martes martes (Linnaeus, 1758) — European pine marten, pine marten
Meles meles (Linnaeus, 1758) — European badger, Eurasian badger
Mephitis mephitis (Schreber, 1776) — striped skunk
Molossus molossus (Pallas, 1766) — Pallas's mastiff bat
Monachus monachus (Hermann, 1779) — Mediterranean monk seal
Mops mops (de Blainville, 1840) — Malayan free-tailed bat
Myospalax myospalax (Laxmann, 1773) — Siberian zokor
Myotis myotis (Borkhausen, 1797) — mouse-eared myotis, greater mouse-eared bat
Nasua nasua (Linnaeus, 1766) — South American coati, coatimundi
Niviventer niviventer (Hodgson, 1836) — Himalayan niviventer, white-bellied rat
Oreotragus oreotragus (Zimmermann, 1783) — klipspringer
Papio papio (Desmarest, 1820) — Guinea baboon
Petaurista petaurista (Pallas, 1766) — red giant flying squirrel
Phocoena phocoena (Linnaeus, 1758) — harbor porpoise, harbour porpoise
Pipistrellus pipistrellus (Schreber, 1774) — common pipistrelle
Pithecia pithecia (Linnaeus, 1766) — white-faced saki
Rattus rattus (Linnaeus, 1758) — black rat, roof rat
Redunca redunca (Pallas, 1767) — Bohor reedbuck
Rupicapra rupicapra (Linnaeus, 1758) — chamois, Alpine chamois
Saccolaimus saccolaimus (Temminck, 1838) — naked-rumped pouched bat
Vulpes vulpes (Linnaeus, 1758) — red fox

Birds

Alle alle (Linnaeus, 1758) — little auk, dovekie
Amandava amandava (Linnaeus, 1758) — red avadavat
Anhinga anhinga (Linnaeus, 1766) — anhinga
Anser anser (Linnaeus, 1758) — greylag goose
Antigone antigone (Linnaeus, 1758) — sarus crane
Apus apus (Linnaeus, 1758) — common swift
Bubo bubo (Linnaeus, 1758) — Eurasian eagle-owl
Buteo buteo (Linnaeus, 1758) — common buzzard
Calliope calliope (Pallas, 1776) — Siberian rubythroat
Cardinalis cardinalis (Linnaeus, 1758) — northern cardinal
Carduelis carduelis (Linnaeus, 1758) — European goldfinch
Casuarius casuarius (Linnaeus, 1758) — southern cassowary
Chloris chloris (Linnaeus, 1758) — European greenfinch
Ciconia ciconia (Linnaeus, 1758) — white stork
Cinclus cinclus (Linnaeus, 1758) — white-throated dipper
Clanga clanga (Pallas, 1811) — greater spotted eagle
Coccothraustes coccothraustes (Linnaeus, 1758) — hawfinch
Cochlearius cochlearius (Linnaeus, 1766) — boat-billed heron
Coeligena coeligena (Lesson, 1833) — bronzy inca
Colius colius (Linnaeus, 1766) — white-backed mousebird
Coscoroba coscoroba (Molina, 1782) — coscoroba swan
Cotinga cotinga (Linnaeus, 1766) — purple-breasted cotinga
Coturnix coturnix (Linnaeus, 1758) — common quail
Crex crex (Linnaeus, 1758) — corn crake, corncrake
Crossoptilon crossoptilon (Hodgson, 1838) — white eared pheasant
Curaeus curaeus (Molina, 1782) — austral blackbird
Curruca curruca (Linnaeus, 1758) — lesser whitethroat
Cyanicterus cyanicterus (Vieillot, 1819) — blue-backed tanager
Cygnus cygnus (Linnaeus, 1758) — whooper swan
Diuca diuca (Molina, 1782) — diuca finch
Dives dives (Deppe, 1830) — melodious blackbird
Ensifera ensifera (Boissonneau, 1840) — sword-billed hummingbird
Erythrogenys erythrogenys (Vigors, 1831) — rusty-cheeked scimitar babbler
Falcipennis falcipennis (Hartlaub, 1855) — Siberian grouse
Francolinus francolinus (Linnaeus, 1766) — black francolin
Galbula galbula (Linnaeus, 1766) — green-tailed jacamar
Gallinago gallinago (Linnaeus, 1758) — common snipe
Gallus gallus (Linnaeus, 1758) — red junglefowl
Granatina granatina (Linnaeus, 1766) — violet-eared waxbill
Grus grus (Linnaeus, 1758) — common crane
Guira guira (Gmelin, 1788) — guira cuckoo
Himantopus himantopus (Linnaeus, 1758) — black-winged stilt
Histrionicus histrionicus (Linnaeus, 1758) — harlequin duck
Ichthyaetus ichthyaetus (Pallas, 1773) — Pallas's gull
Icterus icterus (Linnaeus, 1766) — Venezuelan troupial
Incana incana (Sclater & Hartlaub, 1881) — Socotra warbler
Indicator indicator (Sparrman, 1777) — greater honeyguide
Jacana jacana (Linnaeus, 1766) — wattled jacana
Lagopus lagopus (Linnaeus, 1758) — willow ptarmigan
Lerwa lerwa (Hodgson, 1833) — snow partridge
Leucogeranus leucogeranus (Pallas, 1773) — Siberian crane
Limosa limosa (Linnaeus, 1758) — black-tailed godwit
Luscinia luscinia (Linnaeus, 1758) — thrush nightingale
Manacus manacus (Linnaeus, 1766) — white-bearded manakin
Mascarinus mascarinus  (Linnaeus, 1771) — Mascarene parrot or mascarin
Melanodera melanodera (Quoy & Gaimard, 1824) — white-bridled finch
Milvus milvus (Linnaeus, 1758) — red kite
Mitu mitu (Linnaeus, 1766) — Alagoas curassow
Nycticorax nycticorax (Linnaeus, 1758) — black-crowned night heron
Oenanthe oenanthe (Linnaeus, 1758) — northern wheatear
Oriolus oriolus (Linnaeus, 1758) — Eurasian golden oriole
Pampa pampa (Lesson, 1832) — wedge-tailed sabrewing
Pauxi pauxi (Linnaeus, 1766) — helmeted curassow
Perdix perdix (Linnaeus, 1758) — grey partridge
Petronia petronia (Linnaeus, 1766) — rock sparrow
Phoenicurus phoenicurus (Linnaeus, 1758) — common redstart
Pica pica (Linnaeus, 1758) — Eurasian magpie
Pipile pipile (Jacquin, 1784) — Trinidad piping guan
Poliocephalus poliocephalus (Jardine & Selby, 1827) — hoary-headed grebe
Porphyrio porphyrio (Linnaeus, 1758) — western swamphen
Porphyrolaema porphyrolaema (Deville & Sclater, 1852) — purple-throated cotinga
Porzana porzana (Linnaeus, 1766) — spotted crake
Puffinus puffinus (Brünnich, 1764) — Manx shearwater
Pyrilia pyrilia (Bonaparte, 1853) — saffron-headed parrot
Pyrope pyrope (von Kittlitz, 1830) — fire-eyed diucon
Pyrrhocorax pyrrhocorax (Linnaeus, 1758) — red-billed chough
Pyrrhula pyrrhula (Linnaeus, 1758) — Eurasian bullfinch
Quelea quelea (Linnaeus, 1758) — red-billed quelea
Radjah radjah (Garnot & Lesson, 1828) — radjah shelduck
Regulus regulus (Linnaeus, 1758) — goldcrest
Riparia riparia (Linnaeus, 1758) — sand martin, bank swallow
Rupicola rupicola (Linnaeus, 1766) — Guianan cock-of-the-rock
Serinus serinus (Linnaeus, 1766) — European serin
Spinus spinus (Linnaeus, 1758) — Eurasian siskin
Suiriri suiriri (Vieillot, 1818) — suiriri flycatcher
Sula sula (Linnaeus, 1766) — red-footed booby
Tadorna tadorna (Linnaeus, 1758) — common shelduck
Tchagra tchagra (Vieillot, 1816) — southern tchagra
Temnurus temnurus (Temminck, 1825) — ratchet-tailed treepie
Tetrax tetrax (Linnaeus, 1758) — little bustard
Todus todus (Linnaeus, 1758) — Jamaican tody
Troglodytes troglodytes (Linnaeus, 1758) — Eurasian wren
Tyrannus tyrannus (Linnaeus, 1758) — eastern kingbird
Urile urile (Gmelin, 1789) — red-faced cormorant
Vanellus vanellus (Linnaeus, 1758) — northern lapwing
Xanthocephalus xanthocephalus (Bonaparte, 1826) — yellow-headed blackbird
Xenopirostris xenopirostris (Lafresnaye, 1850) — Lafresnaye's vanga

Reptiles

Agama agama (Linnaeus, 1758) — rainbow agama
Ameiva ameiva (Linnaeus, 1758) — giant ameiva
Basiliscus basiliscus (Linnaeus, 1758) — common basilisk
Calotes calotes (Linnaeus, 1758) — common green forest lizard
Caretta caretta (Linnaeus, 1758) — loggerhead sea turtle
Cerastes cerastes (Linnaeus, 1758) — desert horned viper
Chalcides chalcides (Linnaeus, 1758) — Italian three-toed skink
Clelia clelia (Daudin, 1803) — mussurana
Cordylus cordylus (Linnaeus, 1758) — Cape girdled lizard 
Enhydris enhydris (Schneider, 1799) — rainbow water snake 
Hypnale hypnale (Merrem, 1820) — hump-nosed viper
Iguana iguana (Linnaeus, 1758) — green iguana, common iguana
Naja naja (Linnaeus, 1758) — Indian cobra
Natrix natrix (Linnaeus, 1758) — grass snake
Ophioscincus ophioscincus (Boulenger, 1887) — yolk-bellied snake-skink
Plica plica (Linnaeus, 1758) — collared treerunner
Scincus scincus (Linnaeus, 1758) — sandfish
Suta suta (Peters, 1863) — curl snake
Tetradactylus tetradactylus (Daudin, 1802) — long-toed seps

Amphibians

Bombina bombina (Linnaeus, 1761) — European fire-bellied toad
Bufo bufo (Linnaeus, 1758) — common toad
Pipa pipa (Linnaeus, 1758) — Suriname toad
Salamandra salamandra (Linnaeus, 1758) — fire salamander

Fish

Alburnus alburnus — bleak
Alosa alosa — allis shad
Anableps anableps — largescale foureyes
Anguilla anguilla — European eel
Anostomus anostomus — striped headstander
Anthias anthias — swallowtail seaperch
Aspredo aspredo — a species of banjo catfish
Badis badis — blue perch, blue badis
Bagarius bagarius — devil catfish, goonch
Bagre bagre — coco sea catfish
Banjos banjos — banjofish
Barbatula barbatula — stone loach
Barbus barbus — barbel
Batasio batasio — a species of naked catfish
Belobranchus belobranchus — throat-spine gudgeon
Belone belone — garfish
Bidyanus bidyanus — silver perch
Boops boops — bogue
Brama brama — Atlantic pomfret
Brosme brosme — cusk
Butis butis — duckbill sleeper, crazy fish
Calamus calamus — saucereye porgy
Callichthys callichthys — cascarudo, armoured catfish
Capoeta capoeta — Caucasian scraper, Sevan khramulya
Carassius carassius — crucian carp
Catla catla — catla
Catostomus catostomus — longnose sucker
Chaca chaca — frogmouth catfish
Chandramara chandramara — a species of naked catfish
Chanos chanos — milkfish
Chitala chitala — Indian featherback
Chromis chromis — Mediterranean damselfish, Mediterranean chromis
Conger conger — European conger
Conta conta — conta catfish
Cynoglossus cynoglossus — Bengal tonguesole
Dactylopus dactylopus — Fingered dragonet
Dario dario — scarlet badis, scarlet dario
Dentex dentex — common dentex
Devario devario — Bengal danio
Erythrinus erythrinus — red wolffish
Gagata gagata — a species of sisorid catfish
Glyphis glyphis — speartooth shark
Gobio gobio — gudgeon
Gonorynchus gonorynchus — mousefish, beaked sandfish, beaked salmon
Hara hara — a species of South Asian river catfish
Hemilepidotus hemilepidotus — red Irish lord
Hippocampus hippocampus — short-snouted seahorse
Hippoglossus hippoglossus — Atlantic halibut
Histrio histrio — sargassum fish
Hucho hucho — Danube salmon, huchen
Huso huso — beluga sturgeon
Lactarius lactarius — false trevally
Lagocephalus lagocephalus — oceanic puffer
Lepadogaster lepadogaster — shore clingfish
Leuciscus leuciscus — common dace
Limanda limanda — common dab
Liparis liparis — common seasnail
Lithognathus lithognathus — white steenbras
Lota lota — burbot
Lutjanus lutjanus — bigeye snapper
Menidia menidia — Atlantic silverside
Merluccius merluccius — European hake
Microstoma microstoma — slender argentine
Mola mola — ocean sunfish
Molva molva — common ling
Mustelus mustelus — common smooth-hound
Myaka myaka — myaka
Nangra nangra — a species of sisorid catfish
Notopterus notopterus — bronze featherback
Oplopomus oplopomus — spinecheek goby
Pagrus pagrus — red porgy
Pangasius pangasius — pangas catfish
Phoxinus phoxinus — Eurasian minnow
Phycis phycis — forkbeard
Pinjalo pinjalo — pinjalo
Pollachius pollachius — pollack
Pristis pristis — largetooth sawfish
Pseudobagarius pseudobagarius — a species of stream catfish
Pungitius pungitius — ninespine stickleback
Rama rama — a species of naked catfish
Rasbora rasbora — Gangetic scissortail rasbora
Remora remora — common remora
Retropinna retropinna — New Zealand smelt
Rhinobatos rhinobatos — common guitarfish
Rita rita — rita
Rubicundus rubicundus — a species of hagfish
Rutilus rutilus — common roach
Sarda sarda — Atlantic bonito
Solea solea — common sole
Sphyraena sphyraena — European barracuda
Spinachia spinachia — a species of stickleback
Sprattus sprattus — European sprat
Squatina squatina — angelshark
Synodus synodus — diamond lizardfish
Tandanus tandanus — eel-tailed catfish
Thymallus thymallus — grayling
Tinca tinca — tench
Torpedo torpedo — common torpedo
Trachurus trachurus — Atlantic horse mackerel
Trachycorystes trachycorystes — black catfish
Tropheops tropheops — golden tropheops
Vimba vimba — vimba bream
Zebrus zebrus — zebra goby
Zingel zingel — zingel
Zungaro zungaro — gilded catfish

Arthropods

Anthrax anthrax — a bee fly
Appia appia — appia skipper
Ariadne ariadne — angled castor (a brush-footed butterfly)
Arita arita — arita skipper
Aroma aroma — aroma skipper
Aspitha aspitha — aspitha firetip (a skipper)
Astacus astacus — European crayfish
Avicularia avicularia — pinktoe tarantula
Balanus balanus — a barnacle
Bruna bruna — a skipper
Bucayana bucayana — a cranaid harvestman
Calappa calappa — smooth box crab
Caleta caleta — angled Pierrot (a gossamer-winged butterfly)
Cephise cephise — a skipper
Corticea corticea — redundant skipper
Cossus cossus — goat moth
Crangon crangon — brown shrimp
Cressida cressida — big greasy or clearwing swallowtail butterfly
Cumbre cumbre — a skipper
Cynea cynea — cynea skipper
Danis danis — large green-banded blue (a gossamer-winged butterfly)
Decinea decinea — decinea or Huastecan skipper
Ebusus ebusus — ebusus skipper
Furcula furcula — sallow kitten (a notodontid moth)
Gesta gesta — impostor duskywing (a skipper)
Grapsus grapsus — red rock crab
Gryllotalpa gryllotalpa — European mole cricket
Idea idea — Linnaeus's idea (a brush-footed butterfly)
Joanna joanna — Joanna's skipper
Lamponia lamponia — a skipper
Lento lento — a skipper
Levina levina — a skipper
Librita librita — librita skipper
Ludens ludens — ludens skipper
Mashuna mashuna — Mashuna ringlet (a brush-footed butterfly)
Megacephala megacephala — big-headed tiger beetle
Melolontha melolontha — common cockchafer
Menander menander — menander metalmark
Meza meza — common missile (a skipper)
Misius misius — misius skipper
Moeros moeros — a skipper
Molla molla — a skipper
Narcosius narcosius — a skipper
Neita neita — Neita brown (a brush-footed butterfly)
Nyctelius nyctelius — violet-banded or nyctelius skipper
Orthos orthos — orthos skipper
Pamba pamba — a skipper
Passova passova — passova firetip (a skipper)
Pilosa pilosa — a zalmoxid harvestman
Plumbago plumbago — a skipper
Pollicipes pollicipes — a goose barnacle
Polyctor polyctor — polyctor tufted-skipper
Pompeius pompeius — pompeius skipper
Propertius propertius — propertius skipper
Protesilaus protesilaus — great kite-swallowtail
Punta punta — a skipper
Racta racta — racta skipper
Ranina ranina — red frog crab
Repens repens — a skipper
Ridens ridens — frosted skipper
Sacrator sacrator — a skipper
Salatis salatis — variable scarlet-eye (a skipper)
Saturnus saturnus — a skipper
Scalpellum scalpellum — a goose barnacle
Scolytus scolytus — large elm bark beetle
Sodreana sodreana — a gonyleptid harvestman
Speculum speculum — hidden mirror skipper
Sucova sucova — sucova skipper
Tosta tosta — a skipper
Tromba tromba — a skipper
Turmada turmada — a skipper
Vermileo vermileo — a wormlion
Vidius vidius — a skipper
Xanthostigma xanthostigma — a snakefly
Zera zera — zera skipper
Zingha zingha — a brush-footed butterfly
Zoma zoma — a ray spider
Zonia zonia — zonia skipper
Zygoneura zygoneura — a dark-winged fungus gnat

Molluscs

Achatina achatina — African giant snail, giant tiger land snail
Agagus agagus
Arcinella arcinella — Caribbean spiny jewel box
Belonimorphis belonimorphis
Columella columella
Concholepas concholepas — loco or Chilean abalone
Cymbium cymbium — false elephant's snout volute
Dolabrifera dolabrifera
Ensis ensis — razor clam
Extra extra
Ficus ficus — paper fig shell
Fragum fragum — white strawberry cockle
Gemma gemma — amethyst gem clam
Gibberulus gibberulus — humpbacked conch
Glycymeris glycymeris — dog cockle
Harpa harpa — true harp
Haustellum haustellum
Hippopus hippopus — bear paw clam or horse's hoof clam
Janthina janthina — violet snail
Koilofera koilofera
Lambis lambis — a spider conch
Lima lima — spiny fileclam
Lithophaga lithophaga — date mussel
Lutraria lutraria — otter shell
Margaritifera margaritifera — freshwater pearl mussel
Melo melo — Indian volute  or melon shell
Melongena melongena - Caribbean crown conch 
Mercenaria mercenaria — northern quahog, hard clam
Meretrix meretrix
Mitra mitra — Episcopal miter shell
Modiolus modiolus — northern horse mussel
Modulus modulus
Ogasawarana ogasawarana
Oliva oliva — olive shell
Perna perna — brown mussel
Planorbis planorbis
Quadrula quadrula — mapleleaf mussel
Rapa rapa — bubble turnip
Spirula spirula — ram's horn squid
Staphylaea staphylaea — stippled cowry
Telescopium telescopium — telescope snail
Terebellum terebellum — terebellum conch
Tergipes tergipes
Tricornis tricornis — three-cornered conch
Umbraculum umbraculum — umbrella slug
Velutina velutina — velvet shell
Villosa villosa — a freshwater mussel
Viviparus viviparus — a European freshwater snail
Volva volva — shuttlecock volva

Other 

Aaptos aaptos — a sponge
Acanthogyrus acanthogyrus  — a parasitic worm in the family Quadrigyridae
Cephea cephea — a jellyfish
Chaos chaos — an amoeba
Cidaris cidaris — a sea urchin
Convoluta convoluta — a flatworm
Echiurus echiurus — a spoon worm
Heterophyes heterophyes — an intestinal fluke
Loa loa — a nematode
Mediocris mediocris — a foraminiferan
Moniliformis moniliformis — an acanthocephalan worm
Periphylla periphylla — a jellyfish
Porites porites — a coral
Porpita porpita — a siphonophore
Spirorbis spirorbis — an annelid
Thalassema thalassema — a spoon worm
Tubifex tubifex — sludge worm
Turgida turgida — a nematode
Velella velella — by-the-wind-sailor
Yukonensis yukonensis — an archaeocyathan

Plant near-tautonyms 
Cajanus cajan — pigeon pea
Cuminum cyminum — cumin
Ziziphus zizyphus — jujube (note that the currently accepted name is Ziziphus jujuba)
Salacca zalacca — salak
Silaum silaus – pepper saxifrage
Zinnia zinnioides — Zinnia-like Zinnia

See also 
 List of triple tautonyms
 List of people with reduplicated names
 Bilingual tautological expressions

Zoological nomenclature
Lists of animals